African records in the sport of track cycling are ratified by the Confédération Africaine de Cyclisme (CAC).

Men

Women

References

External links
CAC web site

Track cycling records
Cycling
records